Kesingge was an Inner Mongolian politician of the Republic of China in the 1930s.

Names
He also used the Chinese name Li Chih-nan.

Career
Kesingge was a native of Harqin Right Banner. He was a reserve member of the Kuomintang's Central Executive Committee. Later on, Shi Qingyang (石青陽) tapped him to work for the Mongolian and Tibetan Affairs Commission as Ünenbayan's secretary, in response to increased pressure being put on the commission by Demchugdongrub. In 1934, Kesingge was one of four ethnic Mongol Kuomintang members appointed to the Mongol Local Autonomy Political Affairs Committee when it was created, along with Enkhbat, Serengdongrub, and Ünenbayan.

While working for the Mongolian and Tibetan Affairs Commission, around 1933 he created a set of metal movable type for the Classical Mongolian alphabet. It was used primarily in Nanjing by the Mongolian and Tibetan Affairs Committee and the KMT's public relations division, as well as some churches in Kalgan. The typeface was functional but not particularly attractive, though Kesingge continued to make improvements to it during the period of its use; regardless, it seems to have been superseded by 1937.

References

Bibliography

; alternative URL

Year of birth missing
Year of death missing
Republic of China politicians from Inner Mongolia
Members of the Kuomintang
People from Chifeng